Liberta may refer to:

Places
Liberta, Antigua

Music
"Liberta" (2003 song), a 2003 song by Pep's
"Libertà!" (1987 song) a 1987 song by Al Bano and Romina Power
Libertà! (1987 album) a 1987 album by Al Bano and Romina Power

Other uses
Dacia 1325 Liberta, a car made by Dacia
 Liberty/Libertà, a 2019 exhibition by the sculptor Martin Puryear at the Venice Biennale's American pavilion

See also

Libertas (disambiguation)
Liberty (disambiguation)